The 1997 Big Ten softball tournament was held at Bob Pearl Softball Field on the campus of the University of Iowa in Iowa City, Iowa.  As the tournament winner, Michigan earned the Big Ten Conference's automatic bid to the 1997 NCAA Division I softball tournament. This was the third of four consecutive Big Ten softball tournaments that Michigan won from 1995–1998.

Format and seeding
The 1997 tournament was a four team double-elimination tournament. The top four teams based on conference regular season winning percentage earned invites to the tournament.

Tournament

References

Big Ten softball tournament
Tournament
Big Ten softball tournament